Emma Dumont is an American actress, model, and dancer. She is known for her roles as Melanie Segal in the ABC Family series Bunheads, as Emma Karn in the NBC series Aquarius, and as Lorna Dane/Polaris in the FOX series The Gifted.

Early life and education
Dumont was born in Seattle, Washington. She attended Washington Middle School and later James A. Garfield High School before homeschooling in order to pursue modeling and acting. She also attended Orange County High School of the Arts in the Music and Theater Conservatory in Santa Ana, California.

She began her ballet training at age 3 and has studied at Pacific Northwest Ballet School, Cornish College of the Arts and Spectrum Dance Theatre School (The Academy - pre-professional program) with summers at American Ballet Theatre, Joffrey Ballet School and the Bolshoi Ballet Academy in Moscow, Russia. 

She began performing in community theater at age 6 with performances at Seattle Public Theatre and Seattle Musical Theatre among others. Her musical theater training includes four summers at 5th Avenue Theatre. 

In 2011, she was a member of a FIRST Tech Challenge team located in Pasadena, California and in 2012 a FIRST Robotics Competition team based in Burbank, California in 2013. Dumont became a FIRST Dean's List Finalist at the Los Angeles Regional Competition. Dumont spoke at the 2013 FIRST World Championship at a VIP Dinner on April 26, 2013.

Career
Dumont's first film role was in True Adolescents in 2007 (released 2009) alongside Melissa Leo and Mark Duplass. She later appeared in the movie Dear Lemon Lima (2009).  Both movies were filmed in Dumont's hometown of Seattle.

In January 2010, Dumont won the V magazine V A Model search contest, appearing in the March 2010 issue and receiving a Ford Models contract. 

In 2011, she was cast in a lead role in Stephen Gaghan's NBC pilot Metro, alongside Noah Emmerich and Jimmy Smits. In October 2011, Dumont was cast in the ABC Family original series, Bunheads, starring Sutton Foster and Kelly Bishop. Throughout 2012 and early 2013, she portrayed Melanie Segal, who attends the dance academy run by the lead's mother-in-law in the TV series.

Also in 2012, she appeared in the independent film Nobody Walks alongside Dylan McDermott, John Krasinski, Jane Levy, Olivia Thirlby, and Rosemarie DeWitt.

In 2014, Dumont filmed two television pilots for NBC: Aquarius, which ran for two seasons, and Salvation (starring Ashley Judd), which was not picked up as a series. In March 2017, she was cast in Fox's pilot for an X-Men television series, The Gifted, which was picked up to series in May 2017 and premiered the same year, in October.

She will portray the sister-in-law of J. Robert Oppenheimer in the biopic Oppenheimer, directed by Christopher Nolan.

Personal life
Dumont participated in For Inspiration and Recognition of Science and Technology (FIRST) Robotics on a team sponsored by NASA/JPL and Walt Disney Imagineering.

At age fifteen she became an avid roller derby skater and participated in the Los Angeles Derby Dolls training programs. Dumont, roller derby, and LADD skaters were featured in a 2013 episode of Bunheads.

Filmography

Films

Television

Notes

References

External links
 
 Emma Dumont talks with ComicsVerse about portraying Polaris on The Gifted

Actresses from Seattle
American child actresses
American child models
American female dancers
Dancers from Washington (state)
Female models from Washington (state)
American film actresses
American television actresses
Living people
Musicians from Seattle
Garfield High School (Seattle) alumni
21st-century American actresses
Year of birth missing (living people)